Momentum, Willisau 1988 is a live album by saxophonists Jimmy Giuffre and André Jaume which was released on the Swiss HatOLOGY label in 1997.

Reception 

Allmusic said "Veteran Jimmy Giuffre (heard here on clarinet and soprano) and André Jaume (doubling on tenor and bass clarinet) perform obscure and mostly spontaneous originals. The fairly basic themes contrast sound and silence, and the thoughtful renditions contain subtle surprises and fine interplay. A sleeper that is well worth picking up".<ref name="Allmusic">{{allmusic|first=Scott|last=Yanow|class=album|id=mw0000328764|title=Jimmy Giuffre André Jaume: Momentum, Willisau 1988 – Review |accessdate=March 22, 2017}}</ref> Duck Baker in JazzTimes'' stated "There are moments of real beauty on the best duets, but the cumulative effect of the set is even more rewarding, perhaps because everything that happens is unforced. Good duo work is rare because it’s difficult; Giuffre and Jaume make it sound effortles".

Track listing 
All compositions by Jimmy Giuffre except where noted.
 "Eiffel" – 4:23
 "Momentum" – 2:48
 "I'll Be There" (Giuffre, André Jaume) – 4:00
 "Standpoint" (Jaume) – 3:13
 "Sequence" (Giuffre, Jaume) – 4:15
 "Once" – 2:35
 "Dialogue" – 3:54
 "Dotted Line" (Jaume) – 3:25
 "Mirecourt" (Jaume) – 3:52
 "Dinky Toys II" (Jaume) – 4:53
 "Moonlight" – 4:22
 "Encore"(Giuffre, Jaume) – 4:36

Personnel 
Jimmy Giuffre – soprano saxophone, clarinet
André Jaume – tenor saxophone, bass  clarinet

References 

1997 live albums
Jimmy Giuffre live albums
Hathut Records live albums